Uncle Joe Shannon is a 1978 American drama film directed by Joseph Hanwright and written by Burt Young, who also stars. The film was produced by Robert Chartoff and Irwin Winkler and distributed by United Artists.

Plot
A trumpet player, Joe Shannon believes he has little left to live for when he tragically loses both his wife and child. Only a new relationship with a disadvantaged boy is keeping him from sinking into depression's permanent depths.

Cast
Burt Young as Joe Shannon
Doug McKeon as Robbie
Madge Sinclair as Margaret
Jason Bernard as Goose
Bert Remsen as Braddock
Allan Rich as Dr. Clark
Adrienne Larussa as Peggy

Reception

Jennifer Dunning of The New York Times wrote that Young's screenplay was unsurprising and overly sentimental. She found the film to be "full of odd improbabilities," though she commended director Joseph Hanwright in his debut for drawing good performances from the cast. Dunning also reported of the cinematography, "Bill Butler's cameras capture the slick night surfaces and ruined faces of the street people of Los Angeles so that, clichés in themselves, they have the impact of sudden revelation."

References

External links

1978 films
1978 drama films
American drama films
Films scored by Bill Conti
Films about music and musicians
United Artists films
Films produced by Robert Chartoff
Films produced by Irwin Winkler
1978 directorial debut films
1970s English-language films
1970s American films